Nohsngithiang Falls  (also known as the Seven Sisters Waterfalls or Mawsmai Falls) is a seven-segmented waterfall located  south of Mawsmai village in East Khasi Hills district in the Indian state of Meghalaya.

The falls plunges over the top of limestone cliffs of the Khasi Hills only during the rainy season. In full spate, the segments stretch most of the way along the cliff. The waterfalls get illuminated by the sun and the vibrant colors of the setting sun on the waterfalls makes it beautiful.

In the Sohra area, there are several waterfalls because of the heavy rainfall including Nohkalikai Falls and Dain Thlen Falls. The Jaintia Hills and the Garo Hills also have many waterfalls, notably the Tyrchi Falls en route to Jowai and the Pelga Falls near Tura.

Gallery

See also
List of waterfalls in India
List of waterfalls in India by height
Nohkalikai Falls
Langshiang Falls
Kynrem Falls

References 

East Khasi Hills district
Waterfalls of Meghalaya